Donald Roy Beatty (c. 1930 – October 16, 2010) was a Canadian football player who played for the Hamilton Wildcats, Calgary Stampeders, and Hamilton Tiger-Cats. He won the Grey Cup with Hamilton in 1953. He previously played football at and attended the University of Western Ontario. He died in 2010.

References

1930s births
Calgary Stampeders players
Hamilton Tiger-Cats players
Hamilton Wildcats football players
Western Mustangs football players
2010 deaths